Johann Nepomuk Hofzinser (19 June 1806 – 11 March 1875) was an Austrian-Hungarian magician and illusionist. He used the moniker "Dr. Hofzinser" as a stage name after retiring in 1865.

While he was a conjuror, Hofzinser became well for his inventions, in particular his automata, as well as for card manipulation.

Ottokar Fischer spread the story that upon his death in 1875, Hofzinser's wife destroyed many of his manuscripts to honor her husband's instructions though there is some dispute about this.  Many of his mechanical plans and card-handling methods may forever remain a secret. Several of Hofzinser's pupils preserved portions of their teacher's notes and instructions.  There are still about 270 manuscripts and letters of his own and of his pupils in various collections.

He is portrayed by Philip McGough, in the 2006 movie The Illusionist, starring Edward Norton, Jessica Biel and Paul Giamatti.

References 

 Randi, James. Conjuring. 1992.

External links 
 www.hofzinser.info
 Magic Apparatus of Johann Nepomuk Hofzinser and essay by Magic Christian at the Library of Congress

19th-century Austrian people
Austrian magicians
Entertainers from Vienna
Card magic
1806 births
1875 deaths